Mika Ronkainen (born 6 August 1970) is a Finnish film director and screenwriter from Oulu, Northern Finland. Ronkainen is the co-creator and director of successful crime drama All the Sins and he has also worked with documentary films and theatre. In June 2013 American magazine Variety selected Ronkainen as one of ten up-and-coming European directors to watch.

Career

Documentaries 
Ronkainen's international breakthrough film was Screaming Men (2003), a documentary film about a Finnish screaming male choir called Mieskuoro Huutajat, followed by Freetime Machos (2009), a documentary film about a rugby team which is allegedly the most northern and the third lousiest in the world. Screaming Men had its US premiere at Sundance Film Festival in 2004, and Freetime Machos at Tribeca Film Festival in 2010.

Ronkainen's latest documentary film is a musical road movie called Finnish Blood Swedish Heart, also known as Ingen riktig finne in Swedish, and Laulu koti-ikävästä in Finnish. The film has been awarded with several awards including two Jussi Awards (Finnish Oscars) in 2014: Best Documentary and Best Music, and the Dragon Award for Best Nordic Documentary at Göteborg Film Festival in 2013. Ronkainen adapted the documentary as a theatre play, which had its premiere at Oulu City Theatre in 2016.

Fiction 
Ronkainen's first TV series, All the Sins, a crime-drama that's set in Northern Finland, two seasons of which were released in 2019 and 2020. Ronkainen directed and co-wrote the series. In January 2019, All the Sins was awarded with Nordisk Film & TV Fond Prize at Gothenburg Film Festival in Sweden "for outstanding writing of a Nordic drama series".

Other 
Ronkainen is one of the founders of Air Guitar World Championships which is organized annually in his hometown Oulu, Finland.

Filmography

TV series 
 All the Sins Season 1 and 2 (2019-20)

Documentaries 
 Finnish Blood Swedish Heart (2013)
 Freetime Machos (2009)
 Our Summer (2004)
 Screaming Men (2003)
 Car Bonus (2001)
 Before the Flood (2000)
 The World Will Change Soon (2000)
 Oulu Burning – A Town That Disappeared (1998)
 Father's Day (1998)

Concert Film 
 Sentenced – Buried Alive (concert film) (2006)

References

External links

1970 births
Living people
People from Kuusamo
Finnish film directors